Mauro Zanetti (born 5 April 1973) is a former Italian cyclist. He rode in six editions of the Giro d'Italia and two editions of the Vuelta a España.

Major results

1996
 1st Stage 2 Giro del Friuli Venezia Giulia
 1st Cronoscalata Gardone Val Trompia-Prati di Caregno
 2nd Overall Giro della Valle d'Aosta
1st Stage 6
1998
 1st Coppa Placci
1999
 3rd Coppa Sabatini
2000
 1st Giro dell'Appennino

References

1973 births
Living people
People from Iseo, Lombardy
Italian male cyclists
Cyclists from the Province of Brescia